Loch Hallan is a loch (lake) in the Outer Hebrides, Scotland. It is located in the parish of South Uist, approximately 1 mile south of Askernish and half a mile northwest of Daliburgh. It was designated a Site of Special Scientific Interest by Scottish Natural Heritage in 1988.

References

Hallan
South Uist